Tegula xanthostigma is a species of sea snail, a marine gastropod mollusk in the family Tegulidae.

Description
The size of the shell attains 35 mm.

Distribution
This marine species occurs off Korea, Taiwan and Japan.

References

External links
 Adams, A. (1853). Contributions towards a monograph of the Trochidae, a family of gasteropodous Mollusca. Proceedings of the Zoological Society of London. (1851) 19: 150-192
 Dunker, W. (1860). Neue japanische Mollusken. Malakozoologische Blätter. 6: 221-240
 

xanthostigma
Gastropods described in 1853
Marine gastropods